Sicknature is an independent rapper and hip-hop producer from the southern part of Copenhagen, Denmark. 
He began his career making music and recording with his childhood friend Jesta in the mid 1990s.
Sicknature is also a producer in the hip-hop producer group Snowgoons.

Solo career beginning

Jesta quit making music, but Sicknature would continue on solo. In the late 1990s and early 2000s he was very active with touring (in Denmark) and recording demo projects. In 2004, he was signed to a label. In this connection, he and his childhood friend Jesta got back together to produce songs for the label’s compilation project. However, the label decided to release the songs as a Sicknature project. This explains why this project is not considered an actual Sicknature album. In 2006, Sicknature was unsigned again and started producing songs for artists overseas. Sicknature has worked with artists/groups like La Coka Nostra, ILL BILL, Vinnie Paz, Army Of The Pharaohs, Onyx, M.O.P., Ghostface Killah, Dope D.O.D., members from D12 and many others. He released the first official Sicknature album titled ”Honey Im Home” in 2007. The album was produced by Sicknature himself, Tue Track (Malk De Koijn) and heavy metal producer Jacob Hansen. This album sparked attention in the hip-hop underground around the world and the next year Sicknature started touring outside of Denmark. For a period of time, he was busy touring, producing for other artists, making guest appearances on various projects and joining production team Snowgoons.

In 2013, Sicknature released a solo album titled "Nature Of The Contaminated" through the Snowgoons label Goon MuSick. It was produced by Sicknature himself, except for one song which was produced by Snowgoons and one song that was co-produced by guitarist Dennis Post.

Future projects

According to Sicknature´s social media pages, a new album is supposed to be released in 2016:

New official SICKNATURE ALBUM (TBA) will be coming in 2016...

The record label behind this release is still to be announced. In 2017, Sicknature released an EP called Copenhagen Kaiju with a release date of 24 November 2017. It has guest appearances from Ruste Juxx, Pacewon, Napoleon Da Legend and more.

Discography

Studio albums

2005: The Outbreak (Label: Confidenzial Records)

2007: Honey Im Home (Label: Sicknature)

2013: Nature Of The Contaminated (Label: Goon MuSick)

2016: Nature Of The Contaminated (Remix E.P.) (Label: Sicknature)

Extended plays

2017: Copenhagen Kaiju  (Label: Poetic Droid/Goon MuSick)

Mixtapes

2006: Storm Of The Century (with Capione)

2010: Banished From Home (with Snowgoons) (Label: Goon MuSick) 

A selection of projects on which Sicknature featured

2006: Ill Bill - Ill Bill Is The Future Vol. 2: Im A Goon

2007: Ill Bill - Black Metal

2007: Army Of The Pharaohs – Ritual Of Battle

2008: Snowgoons - Black Snow

2008: Brooklyn Academy – Bored Of Education

2008: Outerspace – God´s Fury

2008: King Syze – The Labor Union

2008: Sabac Red – The Ritual

2009: La Coka Nostra - A 100% Pure Coka

2009: Q-Unique – The Collab Tapes Vol. 1

2009: La Coka Nostra - A Brand You Can Trust

2009: Snowgoons - A Fist In The Thought

2009: Snowgoons - The Trojan Horse

2010: Vinnie Paz – Season Of The Assassin

2010: Canibus - Melatonin Magik

2010: Slaine – The Devil Never Dies

2010: Snowgoons – Kraftwerk

2011: Ill Bill & Vinnie Paz - Heavy Metal Kings

2011: Snowgoons - The Iron Fist

2011: Viro The Virus - Virohazard EP

2011: Snowgoons & Reef The Lost Cauze - Your Favorite MC

2011: M.O.P. - Sparta

2012: La Coka Nostra - Masters Of The Dark Arts

2012: Snowgoons - Terroristen Volk

2012: Snowgoons - Snowgoons Dynasty

2013: NBS - The Smokefest

2013: Goondox - WelcomeTo The Goondox

2013: Snowgoons - Black Snow 2

2014: Onyx - Wakedafucup

2014: Killagoons - Killagoons

2015: NBS - Trapped In America

2016: Onyx – Wakedafucup (Reloaded)

2016: Ill Bill - Septagram

2017: Heavy Metal Kings - F@ck Outta Here

References

Living people
Danish rappers
Danish hip hop
Year of birth missing (living people)